Robert Taylor Dobbins (July 3, 1890 – July 27, 1945) was a college football player and coach.

Early years
Bob Taylor Dobbins was born on July 3, 1890 in Gallatin, Tennessee to Thomas Miller Dobbins and Leila Glass.

Playing career

Sewanee
Dobbins attended Sewanee:The University of the South, where he was a guard and tackle on the Sewanee Tigers football team, captain of its 1915 team. He was selected All-Southern  and a second-team member of Sewanee's all-time football team.

Coaching career
Dobbins coached high school football in Mobile, Alabama for many years.

Howard
Dobbins was an assistant under former Sewanee coach Harris G. Cope at Howard.

See also
 1914 College Football All-Southern Team
 1915 College Football All-Southern Team

References

1890 births
1945 deaths
American football guards
American football tackles
Samford Bulldogs football coaches
Sewanee Tigers football players
All-Southern college football players
High school football coaches in Alabama
People from Gallatin, Tennessee
Sportspeople from Mobile, Alabama